Sergio Mur (born May 23, 1977 in Madrid, Comunidad de Madrid, Spain), is a Spanish television actor.

Filmography

Films

Television roles

References

External links 

1977 births
Living people
Spanish male telenovela actors
Spanish male television actors
21st-century Spanish male actors
Spanish male film actors
Male actors from Madrid